The flag of Honduras consists of three equal horizontal stripes of turquoise, white and turquoise, with five turquoise stars in a quincuncial pattern at the centre of the middle stripe. The two outer bands represent the Pacific Ocean and the Caribbean Sea, and also represent the blue sky and brotherhood. The inner band represents the land between the ocean and the sea, the peace and prosperity of its people, and purity of thoughts. The five stars represent the five nations of the former Federal Republic of Central America and the hope that the nations may form a union again.

In 1823, Honduras joined the United Provinces of Central America and adopted its flag. It continued using a plain blue and white triband after the union dissolved in 1838. On 7 March 1866 five blue stars were placed on the flag to represent the five original provinces: El Salvador, Costa Rica, Nicaragua, Honduras, and Guatemala. The size and position of the stars were officially fixed when the design was standardized on 18 January 1949.

The 1949 decree specified that the stripes were to be turquoise, but in practice the flag remained dark blue for the next seven decades. The Honduran government only began flying turquoise flags after the inauguration of president Xiomara Castro on 27 January 2022, after the National Autonomous University of Honduras made that recommendation in 2021.

Ships of the Honduran Navy fly a naval ensign which has the coat of arms of Honduras above an inverted arch of five small stars and a pendant.

History

United Provinces of Central America 

The origins of the Honduran flag date back to United Provinces of Central America, which Honduras was part of. It was the first country in Central America to use a blue-white-blue triband, which in turn was based on the flag of Argentina

First flag 

Flag used since independence, and finally abolished in 1949. The flag has been defined as flag of the UPOCA without emblem.

Second flags 

On 16 February 1866, President José María Medina modified the coat of arms and flag, adding 5 stars representing the 5 original united provinces. The most popular arrangement of blue stars was similar to the arrangement of the dots on a die, but there were also alternative arrangements. Versions other than the current one disappeared by the 1930s.

Although there wasn't any mention regarding the exact shade of blue to be used, the most common version (including the one used by military forces) used navy blue.

Greater Republic of Central America 

Between 1896 and 1898 Honduras was part of a union known as Greater Republic of Central America. Within the union, Honduras still has its own flag. Around this time, an unofficial version with gold stars comes out, sometimes only considered a mistake. The likely reason for this is that the union used gold stars.

Third flag 

On 26 January 1949, President Juan Manuel Gálvez amended the 1866 decree, confirming the position of the stars. The decree also defined the shade of blue used on the stripes and stars as turquoise. However, that change wasn't implemented and the flag continued to be produced using navy blue for 73 years.

Fourth flag 

In September 2018, an MP proposed to change the colour of the flag to Maya blue, possibly in relation to the Mayan civilization, which occupied part of the country's territory.

In 2020, the National Autonomous University of Honduras published its guidelines regarding the shades of blue used on the flag, due to the "absence" of an official position about the topic. Following the intention of the 1949 decree, the guidelines established a lighter shade of blue for the Honduran flag "until its colors are defined and regulated by legislative decree".

On 4 January 2022, the Honduran Armed Forces announced a change from this month on their monograms, uniforms and logo to represent the national flag in turquoise. The announcement came shortly after President-elect Xiomara Castro also announced the use of the flag in that shade of blue.

Construction

Flags of subdivisions

Departments

See also 

 Coat of arms of Honduras
 National Anthem of Honduras

References

External links

Flag of Honduras
National flags
Flag
Honduras
Honduras
Honduras
Honduran culture